Batesian mimicry is a form of mimicry where a harmless species has evolved to imitate the warning signals of a harmful species directed at a predator of them both. It is named after the English naturalist Henry Walter Bates, after his work on butterflies in the rainforests of Brazil.

Batesian mimicry is the most commonly known and widely studied of mimicry complexes, such that the word mimicry is often treated as synonymous with Batesian mimicry. There are many other forms however, some very similar in principle, others far separated. It is often contrasted with Müllerian mimicry, a form of mutually beneficial convergence between two or more harmful species. However, because the mimic may have a degree of protection itself, the distinction is not absolute. It can also be contrasted with functionally different forms of mimicry. Perhaps the sharpest contrast here is with aggressive mimicry where a predator or parasite mimics a harmless species, avoiding detection and improving its foraging success.

The imitating species is called the mimic, while the imitated species (protected by its toxicity, foul taste or other defenses) is known as the model. The predatory species mediating indirect interactions between the mimic and the model is variously known as the [signal] receiver, dupe or operator. By parasitizing the honest warning signal of the model, the Batesian mimic gains an advantage, without having to go to the expense of arming itself. The model, on the other hand, is disadvantaged, along with the dupe. If impostors appear in high numbers, positive experiences with the mimic may result in the model being treated as harmless. At higher frequency there is also a stronger selective advantage for the predator to distinguish mimic from model. For this reason, mimics are usually less numerous than models, an instance of frequency dependent selection. Some mimetic populations have evolved multiple forms (polymorphism), enabling them to mimic several different models and thereby to gain greater protection. Batesian mimicry is not always perfect. A variety of explanations have been proposed for this, including limitations in predators' cognition.

While visual signals have attracted most study, Batesian mimicry can employ deception of any of the senses; some moths mimic the ultrasound warning signals sent by unpalatable moths to bat predators, constituting auditory Batesian mimicry, while some weakly electric fish appear to mimic the electrolocation signals of strongly electric fish, probably constituting electrical mimicry.

Historical background 

Henry Walter Bates (1825–1892) was an English explorer-naturalist who surveyed the Amazon rainforest with Alfred Russel Wallace in 1848. While Wallace returned in 1852, Bates remained for over a decade. His field research included collecting almost a hundred species of butterflies from the families Ithomiinae and Heliconiinae, as well as thousands of other insects specimens. In sorting these butterflies into similar groups based on appearance, inconsistencies began to arise. Some appeared superficially similar to others, even so much so that Bates could not tell some species apart based only on wing appearance. However, closer examination of less obvious morphological characters seemed to show that they were not even closely related. Shortly after his return to England he read a paper on his theory of mimicry at a meeting of the Linnean Society of London on 21 November 1861, which was then published in 1862 as 'Contributions to an Insect Fauna of the Amazon Valley' in the society's Transactions. He elaborated on his experiences further in The Naturalist on the River Amazons.

Bates put forward the hypothesis that the close resemblance between unrelated species was an antipredator adaptation. He noted that some species showed very striking coloration, and flew in a leisurely manner, almost as if taunting predators to eat them. He reasoned that these butterflies were unpalatable to birds and other insectivores, and were thus avoided by them. He extended this logic to forms that closely resembled such protected species, mimicking their warning coloration but not their toxicity.

This naturalistic explanation fitted well with the recent account of evolution by Wallace and Charles Darwin, as outlined in his famous 1859 book The Origin of Species. Because this Darwinian explanation required no supernatural forces, it met with considerable criticism from anti-evolutionists, both in academic circles and in the broader social realm.

Aposematism 

Most living things have predators and therefore are in a constant evolutionary arms race to develop antipredator adaptations, while the predator adapts to become more efficient at defeating the prey's adaptations. Some organisms have evolved to make detection less likely, for example by nocturnality and camouflage. Others have developed chemical defences such as the deadly toxins of certain snakes and wasps, or the noxious scent of the skunk. Such prey often send clear and honest warning signals to their attackers with conspicuous aposematic (warning) patterns. The brightness of such warning signs is correlated with the level of toxicity of the organism.

In Batesian mimicry, the mimic effectively copies the coloration of an aposematic animal, known as the model, to deceive predators into behaving as if it were distasteful. The success of this dishonest display depends on the level of toxicity of the model and the abundance of the model in the geographical area. The more toxic the model is, the more likely it is that the predator will avoid the mimic. The abundance of the model species is also important for the success of the mimic because of frequency dependent selection. When the model is abundant, mimics with imperfect model patterns or slightly different coloration from the model are still avoided by predators. This is because the predator has a strong incentive to avoid potentially lethal organisms, given the likelihood of encountering one. However, in areas where the model is scarce or locally extinct, mimics are driven to accurate aposematic coloration. This is because predators attack imperfect mimics more readily where there is little chance that they are the model species. Frequency dependent selection may also have driven Batesian mimics to become polymorphic in rare cases where a single genetic switch controls appearance, as in the swallowtail butterflies (the Papilionidae) such as the pipevine swallowtail.

Classification and comparisons 

Batesian mimicry is a case of protective or defensive mimicry, where the mimic does best by avoiding confrontations with the signal receiver. It is a disjunct system, which means that all three parties are from different species. An example would be the robber fly Mallophora bomboides, which is a Batesian mimic of its bumblebee model and prey, B. americanorum (now more commonly known as Bombus pensylvanicus), which is noxious to predators due to its sting.

Batesian mimicry stands in contrast to other forms such as aggressive mimicry, where the mimic profits from interactions with the signal receiver. One such case of this is in fireflies, where females of one species mimic the mating signals of another species, deceiving males to come close enough for them to eat. Mimicry sometimes does not involve a predator at all though. Such is the case in dispersal mimicry, where the mimic once again benefits from the encounter. For instance, some fungi have their spores dispersed by insects by smelling like carrion. In protective mimicry, the meeting between mimic and dupe is not such a fortuitous occasion for the mimic, and the signals it mimics tend to lower the probability of such an encounter.

A case somewhat similar to Batesian mimicry is that of mimetic weeds, which imitate agricultural crops. In weed or Vavilovian mimicry, the weed survives by having seeds which winnowing machinery identifies as belonging to the crop. Vavilovian mimicry is not Batesian, because man and crop are not enemies. By contrast, a leaf-mimicking plant, the chameleon vine, employs Batesian mimicry by adapting its leaf shape and colour to match that of its host to deter herbivores from eating its edible leaves.

Another analogous case within a single species has been termed Browerian mimicry (after Lincoln P. Brower and Jane Van Zandt Brower). This is a case of automimicry; the model is the same species as its mimic. Equivalent to Batesian mimicry within a single species, it occurs when there is a palatability spectrum within a population of harmful prey. For example, monarch (Danaus plexippus) caterpillars feed on milkweed species of varying toxicity. Some feed on more toxic plants and store these toxins within themselves. The more palatable caterpillars thus profit from the more toxic members of the same species.

Another important form of protective mimicry is Müllerian mimicry, discovered by and named after the naturalist Fritz Müller. In Müllerian mimicry both model and mimic are aposematic, so mimicry may be mutual, does not necessarily constitute a bluff or deception and as in the wasps and bees may involve many species in a mimicry ring.

Imperfect Batesian mimicry 

In imperfect Batesian mimicry, the mimics do not exactly resemble their models. An example of this is the fly Spilomyia longicornis, which mimics vespid wasps. However, it is not a perfect mimic. Wasps have long black antennae and this fly does not. Instead, they wave their front legs above their heads to look like the antennae on the wasps.  Many reasons have been suggested for imperfect mimicry.
Imperfect mimics may simply be evolving towards perfection.
They may gain advantage from resembling multiple models at once.
Humans may evaluate mimics differently from actual predators. 
Mimics may confuse predators by resembling both model and nonmimic at the same time (satiric mimicry). 
Kin selection may enforce poor mimicry.
The selective advantage of better mimicry may not outweigh the advantages of other strategies like thermoregulation or camouflage. 
Only certain traits may be required to deceive predators; for example, tests on the sympatry/allopatry border (where the two are in the same area, and where they are not) of the mimic Lampropeltis elapsoides and the model Micrurus fulvius showed that color proportions in these snakes were important in deceiving predators but that the order of the colored rings was not.

Acoustic mimicry 

Predators may identify their prey by sound as well as sight; mimics have accordingly evolved to deceive the hearing of their predators. Bats are nocturnal predators that rely on echolocation to detect their prey. Some potential prey are unpalatable to bats, and produce an ultrasonic aposematic signal, the auditory equivalent of warning coloration. In response to echolocating red bats and big brown bats, tiger moths such as Cycnia tenera produce warning sounds. Bats learn to avoid the harmful moths, but similarly avoid other species such as some pyralid moths that produce such warning sounds as well. Acoustic mimicry complexes, both Batesian and Müllerian, may be widespread in the auditory world.

Electrical mimicry 

The electric eel, Electrophorus, is capable of delivering a powerful electric shock that can stun or kill its prey. Bluntnose knifefishes, Brachyhypopomus, create an electric discharge pattern similar to the low voltage electrolocation discharge of the electric eel. This is thought to be Batesian mimicry of the powerfully-protected electric eel.

See also
Phylogenetics of mimicry
 Papilio dardanus (females mimic multiple model species)
 Locomotor mimicry

Notes

References

Further reading 

 Cott, H.B. (1940) Adaptive Coloration in Animals. Methuen and Co, Ltd., London  Provides many examples of Batesian Mimicry
  For a historical perspective.
 Wickler, W. (1968) Mimicry in Plants and Animals (Translated from the German) McGraw-Hill, New York.  Especially the first two chapters.
 Edmunds, M. 1974. Defence in Animals: A Survey of Anti-Predator Defences. Harlow, Essex & NY: Longman 357 p.  Chapter 4 discusses this phenomenon.
  A detailed discussion of the different forms of mimicry.
 Ruxton, G. D.; Speed, M. P.; Sherratt, T. N. (2004). Avoiding Attack. The Evolutionary Ecology of Crypsis, Warning Signals and Mimicry. Oxford: Oxford University Press.  Chapter 10 and 11 provide an up-to-date synopsis.

External links 

 Review of Contributions to an insect fauna of the Amazon valley by Charles Darwin The Complete Works of Charles Darwin Online.
 Biographical sketch of Bates, with picture

Mimicry
Antipredator adaptations
Chemical ecology